Coconut moth is a common name for several kinds of moth whose larvae are known to feed on the coconut palm. These include:

Batrachedra arenosella, of Australasia
Levuana iridescens or the levuana moth, an extinct moth of Fiji
Atheloca subrufella, of the Americas